Lydia Képinski is a Canadian indie pop singer and songwriter from Quebec.

Life
Képinski is from Montreal and has French and Polish ancestry. She taught herself guitar in high school and has studied classical piano.

Career 
Képinski was the winner of the Francouvertes competition in 2017. Képinski released her debut EP, EP, later that year and received a SOCAN Songwriting Prize nomination in the French division for the song "Apprendre à mentir".

She followed up in 2018 with her debut album Premier juin, which was longlisted for the 2018 Polaris Music Prize. 

In 2022 Képinski released her sophomore album Depuis which was also a longlist nominee for the 2022 Polaris Music Prize. She cites drag culture as one of the influences for Depuis though notes she does not seek to emulate the style directly out of respect for drag performers. Her first concert performance for Depuis was at South by Southwest.

Discography

Studio Albums
Premier juin (2018)
Depuis (2022)

Remix Albums
Premier juin Remix (2019)

Extended Plays
EP (2016)

References

Canadian women singers
Canadian pop singers
Singers from Quebec
French-language singers of Canada
Living people
Year of birth missing (living people)